George T. Stagg is a limited-production bourbon whiskey distributed by Buffalo Trace Distillery, as part of the distillery's "Antique Collection" series. It is a high proof uncut and unfiltered bourbon, aged for approximately 15 years.
It has been distributed only once a year in the fall, but in 2005 a second spring release was added. It is rare to find outside the U.S., but some is distributed in other major cities.

Reviews and awards
The whiskey has been highly awarded in various spirit ratings competitions and has won best rankings in some years in Jim Murray's "Whisky Bible".  The San Francisco World Spirits Competition awarded three gold and three double gold medals to the bourbon between 2006 and 2012.

George T. Stagg was awarded the Chairman's Trophy among Kentucky Straight Bourbons at the 2014 New York "Ultimate Spirits Challenge", and in 2013 it won the Best North American Whiskey award at the World Whiskies Awards.

In December 2015, the 2015 release of George T. Stagg was named "#3 of Top 65 Five-Star Spirits of 2015" and awarded "5 Stars - Highest Recommendation" by F. Paul Pacult's Spirit Journal.  The 2015 release of Stagg also won a Gold Medal in the "Best Non-Age Statement Bourbon" category of the 2016 World Whiskies Awards, sponsored by Whisky Magazine. 

Food critic Morgan Murphy once wrote "If you want your guests' eyes to pop out of their heads in a fit of bourbon ecstasy, this is your bourbon."

Releases

References

Bourbon whiskey
Alcoholic drink brands
American brands
Sazerac Company brands